Pseudoalteromonas bacteriolytica is a marine bacterium that causes red spot disease of Saccharina japonica (species synonym Laminaria japonica).

References

External links

Alteromonadales
Bacteria described in 1998